Longford is a village and civil parish in Derbyshire, England. The population of the civil parish as of the 2011 census was 349.

History
In 1872 the parish of Longford was described as having just over 1150 people and 220 dwellings. This parish took in the settlements of Alkmonton, Rodsley, Hollington and the "liberty" of Hungry Bentley. The first three were owned by the Coke family whilst the "liberty" of Hungry Bentley was in the possession of Lord Vernon.

Amenities
The village is centred on Main Street (which becomes Longford Lane shortly thereafter) and has relatively few amenities. There is a small campsite and playing field adjacent to, and under the control of, The Ostrich Inn.

In early 2012, The Ostrich (as it is known locally) was taken over by new management and has since proceeded to provide a regular set of varied events, from motorcycle conventions, spiritualist evenings, car boot sales and live music.

Notable residents
George Coke was born here in 1646. He was the Bishop of Bristol and of Hereford.
Rev. Thomas Anson a first class cricketer was rector from 1850 to 1899.

See also
Listed buildings in Longford, Derbyshire

References

External links

Villages in Derbyshire
Towns and villages of the Peak District
Derbyshire Dales